Muhammad Ali Madali (also known as Dukchi Eshon in Uzbek language or Iyikchi Eshen in Kyrgyz) was an īshān of the Naqshbandi Sufi order, who led an 1898 revolt against Russian domination, centred in the town of Andijan (in modern Uzbekistan).

Madali, seeking to rid the area of the Russians and restore the formerly independent khanate of Khokand, called for "holy war", and led 2,000 men against the Tsarist Russia.  However, his force was blocked outside the city on Andijan by the Russian 20th Line Battalion and defeated.  Of those 2,000, 546 were put on trial, and Madali and five of his lieutenants hanged.

Most of the sentences people were Kyrgyz people in the Ferghana valley and mountainous areas in Chatkal, Aksy and Ketmen-Tobe in nowadays Southern Kyrgyzstan. Among them was a prominent poet-improviser and composer Toktogul Satylganov (1864–1933), who was jailed by a false accusation by his political foes in the Ketmen-Tobe valley about his alleged participation in the revolt. He returned from a Siberian prison, in the village of Kuitun near the town of Irkutsk, in 1905.

Outcome and interpretations
The Czar recalled the regional governor, General Vrevskii and replaced him with General S. M. Dukhovskii.  The rebellion was attributed to two major factors:  stirring of Islamic feeling (allegedly encouraged by the Ottoman sultan), and a failure of the Russian government to take note of the situation.
Later Soviet commentators declined to recognise the event as a popular movement, noting however that not only the disenfranchised elite, but also the working classes had been drawn to Madali's cause.

In the post-Soviet historiography in Central Asia, the Andijan revolt has been described as a progressive anti-Tsarist movement aimed to establish an independent state in the Ferghana Valley.

References

- Aftandil S.Erkinov. The Andijan Uprising of 1898 and its leader Dukchi-ishan described by contemporary Poets'' TIAS Central Eurasian Research Series No.3. Tokyo, 2009, 118 p.

19th-century Kyrgyzstani people
Uzbek Sufis
Uzbek revolutionaries
Executed revolutionaries
1898 deaths
Militant Sufi organisations
Executed Uzbekistani people
People executed by the Russian Empire by hanging
19th-century executions by the Russian Empire
Uzbekistani religious leaders
Year of birth missing